The Scottsbluff Micropolitan Statistical Area, as defined by the United States Census Bureau, is an area consisting of two counties in Nebraska, anchored by the city of Scottsbluff.

As of the 2000 census, the μSA had a population of 37,770 (though a July 1, 2009 estimate placed the population at 37,512).

Counties
Banner
Scotts Bluff

Communities
Gering
Harrisburg
Henry
Lyman
McGrew
Melbeta
Minatare
Mitchell
Morrill
Scottsbluff (Principal City)
Terrytown

Demographics
As of the census of 2000, there were 37,770 people, 15,198 households, and 10,404 families residing within the μSA. The racial makeup of the μSA was 87.76% White, 0.26% African American, 1.84% Native American, 0.56% Asian, 0.04% Pacific Islander, 7.92% from other races, and 1.61% from two or more races. Hispanic or Latino of any race were 16.94% of the population.

The median income for a household in the μSA was $31,678, and the median income for a family was $40,235. Males had a median income of $27,784 versus $19,734 for females. The per capita income for the μSA was $17,252.

See also
Nebraska census statistical areas

References

 
Scotts Bluff County, Nebraska
Banner County, Nebraska